Le lac (French "the lake") may refer to:

Geography
 Le Lac, Morteau
 Le Lac, on the Via Domitia of Aimery II of Narbonne
 Le Lac (fr), Memramcook  Canada
 Le Lac-d'Issarlès, a commune in the Ardèche department in southern France

-le-Lac
Aiguebelette-le-Lac, a commune in the Savoie department in the Auvergne-Rhône-Alpes region in south-eastern France
Estavayer-le-Lac, a former municipality of the canton of Fribourg, situated on the south shore of Lake Neuchâtel
Ferrières-le-Lac, a commune in the Doubs department in the Bourgogne-Franche-Comté region in eastern France
Ivry-sur-le-Lac, Quebec, a village and municipality in the Laurentides region of Quebec, Canada, part of the Les Laurentides Regional County Municipality
Laval-sur-le-Lac, a small sector on the western part of Laval and was a separate city until the municipal mergers on August 6, 1965
Lépin-le-Lac, a commune in the Savoie department in the Auvergne-Rhône-Alpes region in south-eastern France
Putanges-le-Lac, a commune in the department of Orne, northwestern France
Savines-le-Lac, a commune in the Hautes-Alpes department in southeastern France
Villegusien-le-Lac, a commune in the Haute-Marne department in north-eastern France
Villers-le-Lac, a commune in the Doubs department in the Bourgogne-Franche-Comté region in eastern France

-les-Lacs
Clairvaux-les-Lacs, a commune in the Jura department in Franche-Comté in eastern France
Jugon-les-Lacs, a former commune in the Côtes-d'Armor department of Brittany in northwestern France

-sur-le-Lac
Fossambault-sur-le-Lac is a French-speaking city in the south part of Quebec, Canada, in La Jacques-Cartier Regional County Municipality
Sainte-Marthe-sur-le-Lac, Quebec, an off-island suburb of Montreal, in the Canadian province of Quebec, located in the Deux-Montagnes Regional County Municipality
Témiscouata-sur-le-Lac, a municipality in Quebec, Canada
Vaudreuil-sur-le-Lac, a village municipality in Vaudreuil-Soulanges Regional County Municipality in the Montérégie region of Quebec, Canada

Poetry and music
 "Le Lac" (poem), Alphonse de Lamartine 1820
 "Le Lac" (fr), single by the French band Indochine from their 2009 album La République des Meteors  
 "Le lac" (song) by Julien Doré 2016

See also
Lac (disambiguation)